Plutarchia is a genus of chalcid wasp in the subfamily Eurytominae. Alexandre Arsène Girault first circumscribed the genus in 1925; its name honors Plutarch.  The genus initially only comprised its type species, P. bicarinativentris, found in Australia. Subsequent species from South Asia and Nigeria have been described and transferred to Plutarchia.

Biology
Species in the genus Plutarchia are parasitoids of the puparia of leaf-miner flies.

Distribution
Species in the genus Plutarchia have been found in Africa, South Asia, and Australasia. Of the described species, one is from Africa, one is from Australia, and 11 are from South Asia.

Species
, the Universal Chalcidoidea Database recognizes the following 13 species:
 Plutarchia bengalensis 
 Plutarchia bicarinativentris 
 Plutarchia carinata 
 Plutarchia fronta 
 Plutarchia gastris 
 Plutarchia giraulti 
 Plutarchia gracillima 
 Plutarchia hayati 
 Plutarchia indefensa 
 Plutarchia keralensis 
 Plutarchia malabarica 
 Plutarchia marginata 
 Plutarchia neepalica 

There are at least three additional undescribed species.

See also
 List of organisms named after famous people

References

Further reading

 
 
 

Parasitic wasps
Eurytomidae
Hymenoptera genera
Hymenoptera of Australia
Hymenoptera of Africa
Hymenoptera of Asia